The Domoș is a left tributary of the Crișul Repede in Romania. It flows into the Crișul Repede in Huedin.

References

Rivers of Romania
Rivers of Cluj County